Bonnie D. Ham (born October 5, 1947) is an American politician from the state of New Hampshire. A Republican, Ham has represented the 5th Grafton district in the New Hampshire House of Representatives since 2020.

Prior to her election to the State House in 2020, she served two stints in the State House from 1992 to 2006 and again from 2016 to 2018. She previously served as a Woodstock Selectman from 1974 to 1992.

References

External links
 Electoral history
 Official website

|-

|-

|-

|-

1947 births
21st-century American politicians
Living people
Republican Party members of the New Hampshire House of Representatives
Plymouth State University alumni
21st-century American women politicians